The Clinique Ambroise Paré is a hospital in Conakry, Guinea, is considered to be the best hospital in the country.

Details 
The hospital is named after Ambroise Paré, the father of French surgery.
It is privately owned, providing better care than the government hospitals Ignace Deen and Donka but not as high a standard as in Europe or North America.

Ambroise Paré has an ambulance, and is equipped for surgery. 
It is located on North Corniche next to USAID, southwest of the Conakry Botanical Garden.

History 
In September 2009 a rally at a city stadium in protest against the military junta was violently broken up, with dozens of people being killed by security forces. Former prime ministers Cellou Dalein Diallo and Sidya Touré were injured, and taken to Ambroise Paré. However, soldiers removed them from the clinic and took them to the Alpha Yaya Diallo camp, the junta's headquarters.

See also
Health in Guinea

References

Hospitals in Guinea
Buildings and structures in Conakry